Nocturama may refer to:
Nocturama, or nocturnal house, a facility housing nocturnal animals
Nocturama (album), a 2003 album by Nick Cave and the Bad Seeds
Nocturama (play), a 2008 play by Annie Baker
Nocturama (film), a 2016 French thriller film directed by Bertrand Bonello